Bazar may refer to:

 Bazar, Afghanistan
 Bazar, Azerbaijan
 Bazar, Mardan, Pakistan
 Bazar, Ukraine

In Iran
 Bazar, East Azerbaijan
 Bazar, Gilan
 Bazareh-ye Qarnas, North Khorasan Province
 Bazargah, Qazvin, Qazvin Province
 Bazar, South Khorasan

In Poland
 Bazar, Łódź Voivodeship (central Poland)
 Bazar, Lublin Voivodeship (east Poland)
 Bazar, Masovian Voivodeship (east-central Poland)

See also 
Bazaar (disambiguation)